Kari Aagaard is a Norwegian handball player. She played 92 matches for the Norway women's national handball team between 1973 and 1978.  She participated at the 1973 and 1975 World Women's Handball Championship.

References

External links

Norwegian female handball players
20th-century births
Living people
Year of birth missing (living people)